is a Japanese diplomat. He is the former Director-General of UNESCO. He was first elected in 1999 to a six-year term and reelected on 12 October 2005 for four years, following a reform instituted by the 29th session of the General Conference. In November 2009, he was replaced by Irina Bokova.

He studied law at the University of Tokyo and economics at Haverford College (Pennsylvania, USA) and began his diplomatic career in 1959. Posts held by Mr Matsuura include those of Director-General of the Economic Co-operation Bureau of Japan’s Ministry of Foreign Affairs (1988); Director-General of the North American Affairs Bureau, Ministry of Foreign Affairs (1990); and Deputy Minister for Foreign Affairs (1992–1994). He was Japan’s Ambassador to France from 1994 to 1999. After one year as the Chairperson of UNESCO’s World Heritage Committee, he became UNESCO’s ninth Director-General on 12 November 1999.

Professional
1961–1963: Third Secretary of the Embassy of Japan, Ghana; also accredited to other countries in West Africa
1963–1968: Assumed various posts at the central administration, Ministry of Foreign Affairs
1968–1972: Second Secretary, then First Secretary of the Japanese Delegation to the OECD, Paris
1972–1974: Assumed various posts at the central administration, Ministry of Foreign Affairs
1974–1975: Director of the First North American Division (Political Affairs), Ministry of Foreign Affairs
1975–1977: Director of the Development Cooperation Division, Ministry of Foreign Affairs
1977–1980: Counsellor of the Embassy of Japan, United States of America
1980–1982: Director of the Aid Policy Division, Ministry of Foreign Affairs
1982–1985: Successively Director of the General Affairs Division and Deputy Director-General of the Foreign Minister’s Office
1985–1988: Consul General of Japan in Hong Kong
1988–1990: Director-General, Economic Cooperation Bureau, Ministry of Foreign Affairs
1990–1992: Director-General, North American Affairs Bureau, Ministry of Foreign Affairs
1992–1994: Deputy Minister for Foreign Affairs (Sherpa for Japan at the G-7 Summit)
1994–1999: Ambassador of Japan to France and concurrently to Andorra and Djibouti
1998–1999: Chairperson, World Heritage Committee of UNESCO
1999–2009: UNESCO Director-General (elected to a six-year term on 15 November 1999; re-elected in 2005)

Academic
1956–1959: Faculty of Law, University of Tokyo
1959–1961: Faculty of Economics, Haverford College, USA
1997: Doctor of Laws (Honoris Causa), Jean Moulin University Lyon III
2006: Doctor of Laws (Honoris Causa), University of Santo Tomas, Philippines
2008: Doctor of Philosophy (Honoris Causa), Kyung Hee University, Republic of Korea

Publications
1990: In the Forefront of Economic Cooperation Diplomacy (in Japanese)
1992: History of Japan-United States Relations (in Japanese)
1994: The G-7 Summit: Its History and Perspectives (in Japanese)
1995: Development & Perspectives of the Relations between Japan and France (in French)
1998: Japanese Diplomacy at the Dawn of the 21st Century (in French)
2002: A year of Transition (in English & French)
2003: Building the New UNESCO (in English & French)
2004: Responding to the Challenges of the 21st Century (in English & French)

Notes

External links

UNESCO portal

People from Yamaguchi Prefecture
1937 births
Living people
Ambassadors of Japan to France
Ambassadors of Japan to Andorra
Ambassadors of Japan to Djibouti
UNESCO Directors-General
University of Tokyo alumni
Haverford College alumni
Recipients of the Order of the Sacred Treasure, 1st class
Recipients of the Legion of Honour
Foreign Members of the Russian Academy of Arts
Japanese officials of the United Nations
Consuls General of Japan in Hong Kong